The Horst Bienek Prize for Poetry is a German literary prize named after novelist and poet Horst Bienek. It was established in 1991 and is awarded by the Bavarian Academy of Fine Arts. It is awarded every two years.

Recipients

1991: John Ashbery, Förderpreis: Journal of Literature Neue Sirene
1992: Tomas Tranströmer, Förderpreis: Manfred Peter Hein
1993: Robert Creeley and Walter Höllerer
1994: Seamus Heaney
1995: Johannes Kühn, Förderpreis: Heiderhoff Verlag
1996: Ronald Stuart Thomas, Förderpreis: Kevin Perryman
1997: Oskar Pastior, Förderpreis: Toni Pongratz
1998: Inger Christensen, Förderpreis: Marcel Beyer
1999: Wulf Kirsten, Förderpreis: Amanda Aizpuriete
2000: Philippe Jaccottet, Förderpreis: Stevan Tontić
2001: Michael Hamburger
2002: Adam Zagajewski, Förderpreis: Urs Engeler
2003: Charles Simic, Förderpreis: Bernhard Albers
2004: no award
2005: Alfred Kolleritsch, Förderpreis: Anja Utler
2007: Yves Bonnefoy, Friedhelm Kemp; Förderpreis: Kookbooks-Verlegerin Daniela Seel
2009: Dagmar Nick; Prize for cultural mediation: Lyrik Kabinett
2010: Friederike Mayröcker for the complete works
2012: Elisabeth Borchers for the complete works
2014: Geoffrey Hill, Förderpreise: Tadeusz Dąbrowski und Daniel Pietrek
2016: Aleš Šteger, Förderpreis: Margitt Lehbert
2018: Cees Nooteboom, Förderpreis: Raphael Urweider

References

External links
 

German literary awards
1991 establishments in Germany
Awards established in 1991